Ma Sing-yuen is a famous Hong Kong caricaturist and Chinese ink artist. With his wide interests, he engages in a wide scope of creativity, touching upon aspects of current affairs, historical, biographical, humorous life and children’s educational caricatures.

Ma Sing Yuen was born in Hong Kong and lives in Hong Kong; his ancestral home is Dongguan, Guangdong. His given name is Yuen Chau Chiu and Malone is his other pen name. He used to work as arts director and art editor for newspapers and magazines and has fully dedicated himself to caricature creations since the 1980s, by publishing his works in several major newspapers of Hong Kong, covering topics such as current affairs, politics and humour.

He founded the White Cat Black Cat series with Fong She-mei in 2004. Nowadays, White Cat Black Cat series are well-received by children and parents in Hong Kong. This series is remarkable and has gained many book awards in Hong Kong. Q boy is the main character of White Cat Black Cat series. He is one of the 24 classic local comic characters selected by Create Hong Kong in 2012. The three-dimensional sculpture of Q boy has displayed at Kowloon Park in Tsim Sha Tsui and Golden Bauhinia Square in Wan Chai.

In 2015, Ma held his first Chinese brush paintings exhibition at the City Hall High Block, featuring a collection of black-and-white paintings of landscape and portraits in freehand brushwork. He has demonstrated a bold and flowing style with unconventional composition, subtly displaying a touch of Zen.

In 2017, Ma's second Ink Painting Exhibition was held at Fo Guang Yuan Changhua Art Gallery (Hong Kong). The ideas of the exhibits in ‘Everyday Chan Implications: Ma Sing Yuen’s Ink Painting Exhibition' are drawn from the vast ocean of Chan stories. The artist has translated the wisdom and farsightedness of these stories into a humorous style of Chinese ink painting. It is taking things in a lighthearted way to understand the meaning of life, a way to experience the daily life of sages.

In 2018, Ma held his third Chinese Poetry and Ink Painting Exhibition ‘Glimpse of the Bygone: Ma Sing Yuen's Chinese Poetry and Ink Painting Exhibition’ at the Tsimshatsui Book Centre of the Commercial Press in Hong Kong. He recreated Tang Poetry, Song Ci and Zen thoughts into delicate ink paintings, drawing inspirations from Fun with Classical Chinese jointly produced with Fong She-mei. He was also invited abroad to have a solo exhibition in September at the Nan Tien Temple Fo Guang Yuan Art Gallery in Sydney.

Ink Painting

He has argued that libraries should pay royalties to Hong Kong authors.

References

Living people
Year of birth missing (living people)